The Mayor of Vilnius, officially the Mayor of the municipality of the city of Vilnius (Lithuanian: "Vilniaus miesto savivaldybės meras") is the head of the Lithuanian municipality of the city of Vilnius.

Overview 

Legislative and local executive powers are exercised by the municipality council (Lithuanian: savivaldybės taryba) and the directly elected mayor. 

The mayor is member of municipality's council and chairman of it. Also mayor proposes candidates to his own deputies, the director of municipality administration and his deputies.

History 

Mayor's institution has been established in 1990 and it replaced city's executive committee chairman. From 1990 to 2015 the mayor had been elected by the city's council (since 1995 – city's municipality council). Also between 1990 and 2003 mayor was member of municipality's board, which performed executive functions.

Between 1995 and 2003 the mayor appointed (or fired) eldermen.

Since 2015 the mayor is elected directly in two-round system by voters registered in the municipality.

Mayors 

 Afanasiy Yarzhembskiy – 1876-1883
 Nikolay Rubtsov – 1884-1895
 Konstantin Aleksandrovich Golubinov – 1893-1897
 Pavel Vasilevich Berthold – 1897-1905
 Michał Węsławski – 1905-1916
  – 1918-1919
 Witold Abramowicz – 1919
  – 1919-1927
 Józef Folejewski – 1927-1932
  – 1932-1939
  – 1941-1944
 Vytautas Bernatonis – 1990–1993
 Alis Vidūnas – 1995–1997
 Algirdas Čiučelis – 1997
 Rolandas Paksas – 1997–1999, 2000
 Juozas Imbrasas – 1999–2000, 2007–2009
 Artūras Zuokas – 2000–2003, 2003–2007, 2011–2015
 Gediminas Paviržis – 2003
 Vilius Navickas – 2009–2010
 Raimundas Alekna – 2010–2011
 Remigijus Šimašius – since 2015

References

Bibliography 

 
 

Lists of mayors
Mayors of Vilnius